Penylan Quarry is a quarry and a Site of Special Scientific Interest in Penylan, Cardiff, south Wales. It is a notable paleontological site, containing fossil trilobites and silurian brachiopods.

See also
List of Sites of Special Scientific Interest in Mid & South Glamorgan

References

Sites of Special Scientific Interest in Cardiff
Quarries in Wales